The 2016 United States Senate election in Iowa was held November 8, 2016, to elect a member of the United States Senate to represent the State of Iowa, concurrently with the 2016 U.S. presidential election, as well as other elections to the United States Senate in other states and elections to the United States House of Representatives and various state and local elections.

Incumbent Republican Senator Chuck Grassley won reelection to a seventh term in office. Primary elections were held June 7, 2016, with Grassley facing no primary opposition, and former Lieutenant Governor Patty Judge winning the Democratic nomination. Grassley won a seventh term in a sixth consecutive landslide and outperformed Donald Trump, who also won the state that year; nevertheless, this represented Grassley's worst re-election performance at the time since his first race in 1980, until 6 years later when Michael Franken would not only make Grassley fall below 60% of the vote, but also cut his winning percentage in half and flip several counties (namely Black Hawk, Linn, Story and Polk) that Grassley carried in this election.

Background 
Republican Chuck Grassley was first elected to the Senate in 1980, defeating Democratic incumbent John Culver by 53% to 46%. Since then, Grassley has been re-elected five times, most recently in 2010, on each occasion taking at least 64% of the vote.

Despite speculation that Grassley, who turned 83 years old in 2016, might retire, he announced in September 2013 that he was "making plans to run for re-election", but added that "it's not taking much of my time. I'm concentrating on doing my job for Iowans."

Republican primary

Candidates

Declared 
 Chuck Grassley, incumbent Senator

Withdrawn 
 Robert Rees, talk radio host

Declined 
 Pat Grassley, State Representative and grandson of Chuck Grassley
 Steve King, U.S. Representative
 Tom Latham, former U.S. Representative

Results

Democratic primary

Candidates

Declared 
 Tom Fiegen, former state senator and candidate for the U.S. Senate in 2010
 Rob Hogg, state senator
 Patty Judge, former Lieutenant Governor and former Iowa Secretary of Agriculture
 Bob Krause, former state representative, nominee for State Treasurer in 1978, candidate for Mayor of Waterloo in 1982 and candidate for the U.S. Senate in 2010

Withdrawn 
 Ray Zirkelbach, former state representative

Declined 
 Christie Vilsack, former First Lady of Iowa and nominee for Iowa's 4th congressional district in 2012
 Tom Vilsack, United States Secretary of Agriculture and former Governor of Iowa
 Chet Culver, former governor of Iowa
 Michael Gronstal, Majority Leader of the Iowa Senate and Chairman of the Democratic Legislative Campaign Committee
 Dave Loebsack, U.S. Representative (running for re-election)
 Andy McGuire, Chairwoman of the Iowa Democratic Party and candidate for Lieutenant Governor in 2006
 Tyler Olson, former state representative, former Chairman of the Iowa Democratic Party, and candidate for Governor in 2014

Polling

Results

General election

Predictions

Debates

Polling 

with Rob Hogg

with Tom Fiegen

with Bob Krause

with Tom Vilsack

Results

References

External links 
Official campaign websites (Archived)
 Chuck Grassley (R) for Senate
 Patty Judge (D) for Senate

Iowa
2016
United States Senate